USS Dealey (DE-1006), the lead ship of her class of destroyer escort, was a ship of the United States Navy in commission from 1954 to 1972 and named for Commander Samuel D. Dealey (1906–1944), who was awarded the Medal of Honor as commanding officer of the famous World War II submarine .

History
Dealey was launched 8 November 1953 by Bath Iron Works Corporation, Bath, Maine, sponsored by Mrs. Samuel D. Dealey, widow of Commander Dealey, and commissioned on 3 June 1954.

Homeported at Naval Station Newport at Newport, Rhode Island, Dealey steamed on local exercises, cruised to Key West, Florida, to serve with the Fleet Sonar School, and joined in convoy exercises in the Caribbean during her first two-and-a-half years of service.

On 4 January 1957 she departed Newport for a South American cruise, returning 21 March 1957 for exercises off the United States East Coast. North Atlantic Treaty Organization (NATO) exercises in the Irish Sea in September and October 1957 took her to Plymouth, England, and Brest and Cherbourg, France.

On 12 May 1958 Dealey sailed for the Mediterranean as flagship of Escort Squadron 10 (CortRon 10), screening the aircraft carrier  to her duty with the United States Sixth Fleet. Dealey patrolled the eastern Mediterranean during the Lebanon crisis and returned to Newport on 7 October 1958.

On 3 February 1959 Dealey put to sea for Guantanamo Bay Naval Base, Cuba, and after exercises there transited the Panama Canal for calls at Buenaventura, Colombia; Salinas, Ecuador; Talara and Callao, Peru; and Valparaíso and Antofagasta, Chile. During this cruise she exercised with the navies of all four countries. She returned to Newport on 20 April 1959, and sailed on NATO exercises, calling at Derry, Northern Ireland; Greenwich, England; and Lisbon, Portugal, before returning to Newport on 11 October 1959. She operated in the Narragansett Bay area for the remainder of 1959.

Dealey continued these operations, plus a cruise to the Caribbean and an amphibious exercise off the Virginia and North Carolina coasts, until 20 June 1960 when she began a short overhaul at the New York Naval Shipyard in Brooklyn, New York. Returning to Newport on 22 July 1960, she prepared for distant duty. On 22 August 1960, she sailed for exercises in the Caribbean, and continued on a voyage around South America. After visits to Trinidad, Venezuela, and Colombia, Dealey sailed through the Panama Canal, down the coast of South America, calling in Ecuador, Peru, and Chile, transited the Straits of Magellan, and turned northward, visiting Argentina, Uruguay, Brazil, and Trinidad. After riding out a wild storm, Dealey arrived home in Newport coated in ice on 13 December 1960; she passed the remainder of 1960 there.

ROU 18 De Julio (DE-3) 
Dealey was decommissioned on 28 July 1972 and simultaneously stricken from the Naval Vessel Register. She was transferred to the Uruguayan Navy the same day, and renamed ROU 18 De Julio (DE-3), the third ship to commemorate the date of the adoption of Uruguays first constitution. She arrived at Montevideo, Uruguay on 17 April 1973.

In 1981, 18 de Julio rescued the crew of the merchant ship MS Harp, sunk in heavy storm in the South Atlantic Ocean.

18 de Julio was stricken and broken up for scrap during 1991.

References

External links 
 navsource.org: USS Dealey
  hazegray.org: USS Dealey
 USS Dealey website dead link
"The Pouncer Challenges The Sub." Popular Mechanics, April 1955, pp. 88–93.

 

Dealey-class destroyer escorts
Ships built in Bath, Maine
1953 ships
Cold War frigates and destroyer escorts of the United States
Ships transferred from the United States Navy to the National Navy of Uruguay
Maritime incidents in 1981